The Placid series was a fleet of ten lightweight streamlined sleeping cars built by Pullman-Standard for the Union Pacific Railroad in 1956. Each car contained eleven double bedrooms. Amtrak acquired all ten from the Union Pacific and operated them into the 1980s; it retired the last in 1996. Several cars remain in private use.

Design 
As with all cars built for the Union Pacific, save the Pacific series sleeping cars, the Placid series cars were smooth-sided, not corrugated.

Service history 
The Union Pacific took delivery of all ten cars in 1956 and they saw service on a variety of trains, including the City of Portland and City of Los Angeles.

Amtrak acquired all ten cars from the Union Pacific in 1971 and operated them through the 1970s; all but one were retired by 1981. The remainder, Placid Scene, it converted from steam heating to head end power (HEP) in 1984 as part of its Heritage Fleet program, part of a pool of nine 11-bedroom sleeping cars. Amtrak assigned Placid Scene to the revived Auto Train. In 1996 Amtrak sold it to American Orient Express, who renamed it Grand Canyon. There it was reunited with three other of the Placid series: Berlin (ex-Placid Lake), Vienna (ex-Placid Waters), and Placid Bay.

References

External links 

 List of cars produced

Pullman Company
Rail passenger cars of the United States
Union Pacific Railroad
Vehicles introduced in 1956